Mind Magic is the second album by vocalist David Oliver.

Track listing
Who Are You 	3:43 	
I Wanna Write You a Love Song 	6:13 	
Housewives Are People Too 	4:38 	
When the Thrill Comes 	3:28 	
Private Secretary 	3:44 	
One Night Man 	3:38 	
Southern Comfort 	3:45 	
I Surrender 	3:26 	
Take My Emptiness 	3:07

Charts

References

External links
 David Oliver-Mind Magic at Discogs

1978 albums
David Oliver (singer) albums
Mercury Records albums
Albums produced by Wayne Henderson (musician)